Vatica affinis is a species of plant in the family Dipterocarpaceae. It is endemic to Sri Lanka. It is a Critically endangered species threatened by habitat loss.

References

affinis
Endemic flora of Sri Lanka
Trees of Sri Lanka
Critically endangered flora of Asia
Taxonomy articles created by Polbot